Gusty may refer to:


People
 Gusty Bausch (born 1980), Luxembourgian cyclo-cross cyclist
 Gusty Spence (1933–2011), a leader of the Ulster Volunteer Force
 Grégoire Laurent (1906–1985), Luxembourgian boxer also known as "Gusty"
 Gustavus Louis "Gusty" Fries, the founder of a local park known as Fries Park in Marrtown, West Virginia
 "Gusties", nickname of students of Gustavus Adolphus College, St. Peter, Minnesota

Fictional characters
 Gusty, a cartoon character created by the meteorologist Don Woods
 Arthur Gusty and Mrs. Gusty, characters from the 1938 film Everything Happens to Me
 Gusty and Baby Gusty, characters from the television series My Little Pony
 Gusty, an elf character in Wee Sing: The Best Christmas Ever!

Places
 Gusty Gully, a small Antarctic north-south valley
 Gusty Peak, a mountain in Alberta, Canada

See also
 Gusty's Child, a memoir by Alice Tisdale Hobart
 Gust (disambiguation)
 Windy (disambiguation)